Justice Chakravarthy is a 1984 Telugu-language legal drama film, produced and directed by Dasari Narayana Rao under his Taraka Prabhu Films banner. It stars Akkineni Nageswara Rao, Jayasudha, Sumalatha,  Suhasini and music composed by Ramesh Naidu.

Plot
The film opens with Justice Chakravarthy (Akkineni Nageswara Rao), a champion of justice, leading a happy life with his wife Jayanthi (Jayasudha), three children - Kalyan (also Akkineni Nageswara Rao) who is an advocate, Inspector Pavan Kumar (Murali Mohan) and a daughter Lakshmi (Suhasini). Chakravarthy loves his daughter dearly and arranges her marriage to a seemingly intelligent man named Pratap (Pratap Pothan). However, after the marriage, it is revealed that Pratap is a hardcore criminal who had married Lakshmi only to protect himself from the judiciary. When Pratap's henchman Ganganna (Arjan Janardhan Rao) is caught by the police and a case is filed in court, Pratap threatens Chakravarthy to give a judgment in his favor. However, Chakravarthy refuses and sentences him. Enraged, Pratap kills Lakshmi and cleverly escapes the sentence using a cunning lawyer named Baroda Bachchan (Dasari Narayana Rao).

Chakravarthy is pressured to give a judgment in favor of Pratap, but he refuses, causing his entire family to leave him. Jayanthi passes away due to the stress of the situation. Chakravarthy decides to take revenge and kills Pratap, surrendering himself to the police. In court, he agrees to being guilty, but Baroda Bachchan arrives and proves Chakravarthy innocent. However, Chakravarthy's conscience haunts him as he cannot accept that he took the law into his own hands. Thus, he alone enters the court hall, stands in the witness box, prosecutes himself, and gives himself a judgment of death sentence. The next day, Chakravarthy is found dead in the court hall.

Cast
Akkineni Nageswara Rao as Justice Chakravarthy & Kalyan (Dual role)
Jayasudha as Jayanthi
Sumalatha as Latha
Suhasini as Lakshmi
Dasari Narayana Rao as Lawyer Baroda Bachchan 
Murali Mohan as Inspector Pavan Kumar  
Pratap K. Pothen as Pratap
Chalapathi Rao as Dawood
Arjan Janardhan Rao as Gaganna
Raadhika as herself in cameo appearance
Vijaya Lalitha as item number
Anuradha as item number
Vijaya Chamundeswari (daughter of Savitri) as Pavan's wife

Crew
Art: Bhaskar Raju
Choreography: Saleem
Stills: M. Krishna
Fights: Sambasiva Rao
Playback: S. P. Balasubrahmanyam, P. Susheela, S. P. Sailaja
Music: Ramesh Naidu
Editing: B. Krishnam Raju
Cinematography: P. S. Selvaraj
Story - Screenplay - Dialogues - Lyrics - Producer - Director: Dasari Narayana Rao 
Banner: Taraka Prabhu Films
Release Date: 20 September 1984

Soundtrack

Music composed by Ramesh Naidu. Lyrics were written by Dasari Narayana Rao. Music released on SEA Records Audio Company.

References

1980s legal drama films
Indian legal drama films
Indian courtroom films
Films directed by Dasari Narayana Rao
Films scored by Ramesh Naidu
1980s Telugu-language films